The skor yeam (guard drum) also known as the skor pheary,  skor chey (successful drum) and skor torb (soldier drum) is a Cambodian base drum, similar in shape to the skor samphor, but much larger. The drums are ancient in origin, used originally in war to "beat command signals" or gather soldiers together. In temples they are used to call Buddhists together or announce ceremonies. Where the samphor is hand-played, the skor yeam is played with a drumstick. The instrument is similar in size and shape to the Thai taphon mon.

As the "skor yeam" the drum was played in Cambodian "Tom Ming" music, played at funerals. As the skor pheary or skor peiry, the instrument was used in monasteries, much as the bells in Catholic monasteries, signaling times for prayer and religious services.

See also
Music of Cambodia

References

External links
UNESCO document, Traditional Musical Instruments of Cambodia. PDF.
A monk playing a skor yeam.
Picture of two skor yeam or skor pheary drums on stands.
Photo, monk beating a skor pheary

Hand drums
Cambodian musical instruments